Smithville is an unincorporated community in southern Ritchie County, West Virginia, United States.  It lies along West Virginia Route 47 south of the town of Harrisville, the county seat of Ritchie County.  Its elevation is 686 feet (209 m).  It has a post office with the ZIP code 26178.

The community was named after Barnes Smith, Sr., the original owner of the town site.

References

Unincorporated communities in West Virginia
Unincorporated communities in Ritchie County, West Virginia